Big Brother: Most Wanted 2017, also known as Big Brother All Stars 2017 was the fifth season of the all-star spin-off of Big Brother and the twentieth season of the format in Bulgaria overall. It was announced on November 3, 2017. Followed the same air schedule as in 2012, 2013, 2014 and 2015, it commenced on Nova Television on 13 November 2017, immediately after the VIP Brother 9 finale and lasted for a month, ending on 11 December 2017. It featured housemates from previous seasons of the show, as well as participants from other reality formats. Georgi "Gino" Tashev won with Konstantin Slavchev as the runner-up.

Housemates
12 housemates entered the house on Day 1.

Debora 
Debora Ivanova was a Miss Bulgaria 2009 candidate. She entered the house on Day 1 and was ejected on Day 10.

Dimitar 
Dimitar Kovachev "Funky" was a contestant from VIP Brother 4 where he finished second. He entered the house on Day 1 and finished fourth in the finale on Day 29.

Georgi 
Georgi Tashev "Gino Biancalana" - "White wool" was a contestant from VIP Brother 7 where he won. He entered the house on Day 1 and became a winner on Day 29.

Gospodin 
Gospodin Valev "Dinko" was a houseguest from The Farm 2. He entered the house on Day 1 and finished third in the finale on Day 29.

Kiril 
Kiril Simeonov was a contestant from Big Brother 5 where he finished second. He entered the house on Day 1 and was the first evicted on Day 8.

Konstantin 

Konstantin Slavchev was a contestant from VIP Brother 1 where he won. He entered the house on Day 1 and finished second in the finale on Day 29.

Luna 
Luna Yordanova was a contestant from VIP Brother 7. She entered the house on Day 1 and was ejected on Day 24.

Lyudmila 
Lyudmila Zahazhaeva was a houseguest from VIP Brother 6. She entered the house on Day 1 and finished sixth in the finale on Day 29.

Mariela 
Mariela Nordel was a contestant from MasterChef 1. She entered the house on Day 1 and was the third evicted on Day 22.

Radomir 
Radomir Yunakov "Dee" was a contestant from The Farm 2. He entered the house on Day 1 and was the second evicted on Day 15.

Svetlana 
Svetlana Vasileva was a contestant from VIP Brother 7. She entered the house on Day 1 and finished fifth in the finale on Day 29.

Zornitsa 
Zornitsa Lindareva was a contestant from VIP Brother 6. She entered the house on Day 1 and was the fourth evicted on Day 26.

Nominations table

Notes

References

External links
 Official website

2017 Bulgarian television seasons
VIP Brother seasons
2017 Bulgarian television series endings